Andrena semilaevis  is a Palearctic species of mining bee.

References

External links
Images representing Andrena semilaevis  

Hymenoptera of Europe
semilaevis
Insects described in 1903